Sideling Hill Creek is a  tributary stream of the Potomac River in the U.S. states of Maryland and Pennsylvania. Sideling Hill Creek flows southward along the western flanks of Sideling Hill, from which the stream takes its name. It forms the boundary between Allegany and Washington counties in Maryland.

Sideling Hill Creek is not navigable by boat.

See also
List of Maryland rivers
List of rivers of Pennsylvania

References

Rivers of Allegany County, Maryland
Rivers of Washington County, Maryland
Rivers of Maryland
Rivers of Pennsylvania
Rivers of Bedford County, Pennsylvania
Rivers of Fulton County, Pennsylvania
Tributaries of the Potomac River